Uffington railway station (sometimes marked as Uffington Junction) is a former station on the Great Western Main Line. The station was located north-east of the village of Uffington, on the east side of the road between Fernham and Baulking.

In 1864 Uffington became a junction as the Faringdon Railway opened between there and the town of Faringdon. In 1886 the GWR took over the Faringdon Railway.

The station closed in 1964 and the station was demolished the following year,

References

Further reading
 In this omnibus edition of his memoirs, Vaughan describes his time in the early 1960s as a Signalman at Uffington station. Appendices show track layout and signalling.

Disused railway stations in Oxfordshire
Great Western Main Line
Former Great Western Railway stations
Railway stations in Great Britain opened in 1864
Railway stations in Great Britain closed in 1964
Beeching closures in England